Kajetan Stefanowicz (12 July 1886, in Drohobycz – 20 September 1920, near  Rohaczów) was a Polish Art-Nouveau painter and illustrator of Armenian ancestry who served as a Rotmistrz (Cavalry Captain) with the Polish Legions in World War I.

Biography 
He was taught the basics of drawing and painting by his father, the portrait painter, Antoni Stefanowicz. This was followed by studies at the Kraków Academy of Fine Arts with Józef Pankiewicz and Józef Mehoffer; the Academy of Fine Arts, Munich, with Otto Seitz, and private lessons in Paris with Ferdinand Humbert.

He began working primarily as an illustrator; favoring fairy tales and Orientalist themes. He also did posters and designed women's clothing and furniture. Later, he painted decorations at the offices of the Land Credit Society in Lwów (now a branch of the National Bank of Ukraine) and was a co-founder of the artistic and literary magazine, Wianki (Garlands). Along with many Polish artists, he was a contributor to Tygodnik Illustrowany.

In February, 1915, he joined the Legion Wschodni, under the command of Władysław Belina-Prażmowski, and received the nickname "Soplica". He served throughout the war and participated in the Battle of Lemberg. During the Polish-Soviet War, he fought in the Battle of Koziatyn and the seizure of Chyrów. He was killed just before the beginning of the truce.

In 1916, he published Song of the Legionnaires: drawings of Kajetan Stefanowicz - Petty Officer 1st Regiment of the Polish Legions, a collection of engravings. He received several posthumous awards, including the Order Virtuti Militari, Cross of Independence and Cross of Valour, and was buried at the Cemetery of the Defenders of Lwów.

Selected paintings

References

External links 

 Works by Stefanowicz @ the Wirtualne Muzeum Secesji
 Song of the Legionnaires ... full text at the Jagiellonian Digital Library

1886 births
1920 deaths
20th-century Polish painters
20th-century Polish male artists
Art Nouveau designers
Orientalist painters
People from Drohobych
Polish illustrators
Polish Legions in World War I
Polish people of Armenian descent
Recipients of the Cross of Independence
Recipients of the Cross of Valour (Poland)
Polish male painters